Events from the year 1853 in China.

Incumbents 
 Xianfeng Emperor (3rd year)

Viceroys
 Viceroy of Zhili — Nergingge (dismissed), Guiliang

Events 

 Nian Rebellion
 Taiping Rebellion
 March 19 — Battle of Nanjing (1853), Taiping forces capture Nanjing
 May 8 —  Northern Expedition launched with the aim of capturing Beijing
 May 19 — Western Expedition launched along the Yangtze River
 A Xiang Army branch led by Guo Songtao retakes Nanchang, Jiangxi from the Taiping forces
 a conflict between Han and Hui miners in Yunnan contributes to the later Panthay Rebellion
 Small Swords Society uprising in Shanghai begins